Metheny Mehldau Quartet is a jazz album by guitarist Pat Metheny and pianist Brad Mehldau, released in 2007 by Nonesuch Records. It features bassist Larry Grenadier and drummer Jeff Ballard.

Background
An earlier disc from the pair, Metheny Mehldau, was released in 2006 and contains mostly duet recordings with the exception of two tracks. On this album, however, Mehldau's two trio men, Jeff Ballard and Larry Grenadier, are much more present, hence the title of the album.

The tracks on Metheny Mehldau Quartet come from the same December 2005 recording sessions between Pat Metheny and Brad Mehldau that produced Metheny Mehldau.

Track listing

Personnel
 Pat Metheny – guitar, 42-string Pikasso guitar (track 2), acoustic guitar (track 4), guitar synthesizer (tracks 5 and 9)
 Brad Mehldau – piano
 Larry Grenadier – double bass
 Jeff Ballard – drums
Note
Tracks 2, 4, 6, and 11 are Metheny and Mehldau duets.

References

External links
 Pat Metheny.com: Metheny Mehldau Quartet Album information at Pat Metheny official website
 Brad Mehldau.com: Metheny Mehldau Quartet Album information at Brad Mehldau official website
 All About Jazz Review of Metheny Mehldau Quartet

Pat Metheny albums
Brad Mehldau albums
2007 albums
Collaborative albums